The Profiteer is a 1919 American silent war drama film directed by John K. Holbrook and starring Jack Sherrill, Alma Hanlon and Robin H. Townley.

Cast
 Jack Sherrill as Tom Merritt
 Alma Hanlon 	
 Robin H. Townley 		
 Charles Bowell 	
 F.W. Stewart 		
 Dorothy Kingdon	
 E.L. Howard 	
 Louise Hotaling

References

Bibliography
 Robert B. Connelly. The Silents: Silent Feature Films, 1910-36, Volume 40, Issue 2. December Press, 1998.

External links
 

1919 films
1919 drama films
1910s English-language films
American silent feature films
Silent American drama films
American black-and-white films
Arrow Film Corporation films
1910s American films